Raye Virginia Allen is an American cultural historian and author.

Personal life
Allen graduated from the University of Texas at Austin where she completed a Bachelor of Arts and a Master of Arts degree. She helped found the Cultural Activities Center in Temple, Texas during the 1950s, later becoming a founding trustee of the American Folklife Center at the Library of Congress and the Fund for Folk Culture.

Recognition
Her book Gordon Conway: Fashioning a New Woman won the Liz Carpenter Women's History Award and the Violet Crown Non-Fiction Award. A $2,000 scholarship was founded in her name, titled the Raye Virginia Allen State President Scholarship.

References

Cultural historians
American women non-fiction writers